Rathinch is a townland in the civil parish of Ballymurreen, County Tipperary. At the time of the 1911 census, there were three households, containing people of four different surnames (Delaney, Woodlock, Kearney and Cass) in the townland. According to death notices appearing in 2012, the townland still contained people bearing the two latter surnames.

References

Townlands of County Tipperary